Karalar, also spelled Qaralar, is a Turkic word. It may refer to:

Places

Armenia
Karalar, Ararat

Azerbaijan
Qaralar, Beylagan
Qaralar, Imishli
Qaralar, Qubadli
Qaralar, Saatly
Qaralar, Sabirabad
Qaralar, Shamkir
Qaralar, Tovuz
Yuxarı Qaralar
Qaracalar, also known as Karalar

Iran
Qaralar-e Aqataqi, a village in West Azerbaijan Province
Qaralar-e Hajjqasem, a village in West Azerbaijan Province
Qaralar-e Kuh, a village in West Azerbaijan Province
Qaralar-e Lotfollah Beyg, a village in West Azerbaijan Province
Qaralar-e Tasuji, a village in West Azerbaijan Province

Turkey
 Karalar, Besni, a village in the district of Besni, Adıyaman Province
 Karalar, Çınar
 Karalar, Çivril
 Karalar, Gazipaşa, a village in the district of Gazipaşa, Antalya Province
 Karalar, Kalecik, a village in the district of Kalecik, Ankara Province
 Karalar, Kazan, a village and neighborhood in the district of Kazan, Ankara Province
 Karalarbahşiş, a village in the district of Anamur, Mersin Province

See also
 Karalılar (disambiguation)